Dee Gee Days: The Savoy Sessions is a compilation album by trumpeter Dizzy Gillespie featuring performances recorded in 1951 and 1952 and originally released on Gillespie's own Dee Gee Records label. Many of the tracks were first released as 78 rpm records but were later released on albums including School Days (Regent) and The Champ (Savoy).

Reception

The Allmusic review stated "Instrumentally concise, always with a harmonic depth and technical brilliance that punctuates bebop, and a recording technology enhanced from the '40s, Dee Gee Days will stand forever as one of the most important albums in jazz history, and belongs in every serious -- or whimsical -- jazz lover's collection -- period!"

Track listing
All compositions by Dizzy Gillespie except as indicated
 "Tin Tin Deo" (Gillespie, Gil Fuller, Chano Pozo) - 2:43 
 "Birks' Works" - 3:07 
 "We Love to Boogie" - 2:53 
 "Oh, Lady Be Good!" (George Gershwin, Ira Gershwin) - 2:42 
 "Love Me Pretty Baby" (Kenny Clarke) - 3:03 
 "The Champ" - 5:39 
 "I'm In a Mess" (A. White, P. White) - 2:13 
 "School Days" (Will D. Cobb, Gus Edwards) - 3:09 
 "Swing Low Sweet Cadillac"  - 3:10 
 "Bopsie's Blues" [alternate take] - 3:16 
 "Bopsie's Blues" - 2:34 
 "I Couldn't Beat the Rap" - 2:56 
 "Caravan" [alternate take] (Juan Tizol) - 2:56 
 "Caravan" (Tizol) - 2:54 
 "Nobody Knows" (Clarke) - 2:40 
 "The Bluest Blues"  (Gary McFarland, Sir Charles Thompson) - 2:55 
 "On the Sunny Side of the Street" (Dorothy Fields, Jimmy McHugh) - 3:08 
 "Stardust" (Hoagy Carmichael) - 3:03 
 "Time on My Hands" (Vincent Youmans, Harold Adamson, Mack Gordon) - 2:24 
 "Blue Skies" (Irving Berlin) - 2:19 
 "Umbrella Man" (James Cavanaugh, Vincent Rose, Larry Stock) - 2:26 
 "Confessin' (Pop's)" (Doc Daugherty, Ellis Reynolds) - 3:33 
 "Ooh-Shoo-Be-Doo-Bee" (Gillespie, Joe Carroll, Bill Graham) - 3:21 
 "They Can't Take That Away from Me" (Gershwin, Gershwin) - 3:45 
Recorded in New York City on March 1 (tracks 1-3), April 16 (tracks 4-6), August 16 (tracks 7-12), October 25 (tracks 13-19), 1951 and in Chicago on July 18 (tracks 20-24), 1952

Personnel
Dizzy Gillespie - trumpet, vocals
John Coltrane - alto saxophone, tenor saxophone (tracks 1-3)
Budd Johnson - tenor saxophone (tracks 4-6)  
Bill Graham - baritone saxophone (tracks 7-24) 
J. J. Johnson - trombone (tracks 4-6) 
Stuff Smith - violin (tracks 13, 14 & 17-19) 
Kenny Burrell - guitar (tracks 1-3) 
Wynton Kelly - piano (tracks 20-24) 
Milt Jackson - piano, vibes (tracks 1-19) 
Bernie Griggs (tracks 20-24), Percy Heath (tracks 1-19) - bass
Art Blakey (tracks 4-6), Kansas Fields (tracks 1-3), Al Jones (tracks: 7-24) - drums 
Joe Carroll (tracks 4, 7, 8, 15-17 & 20-23), Melvin Moore (tracks 5 & 10-12), Freddy Strong (track 3) - vocals

References 

Dizzy Gillespie albums
1976 compilation albums
Savoy Records compilation albums